José Antonio Infantes Florido (born in Almadén de la Plata Spain, 24 January 1920 - died Gelves, 6 November 2005) was a Spanish Roman Catholic bishop.

Priesthood
He studied in the seminary of Valencia and on 19 May 1951 he was ordained a priest.

Episcopal ministry
On 20 July 1967, Pope Paul VI appointed him bishop of the Diocese of Canarias, which covers the three islands of Gran Canaria, Lanzarote and Fuertaventura in the Spanish Canary Islands, he was consecrated on 21 September of that year with Cardinal José Bueno y Monreal, Archbishop of Seville, being the chief celebrant. On 25 May 1978 he was appointed Bishop of Córdoba.
On 15 March 1996, having reach the obligatory retirement age, Pope John Paul II accepted his resignation.

Death
He died in his home in Gelves on 6 November 2005 at the age of 85.

See also
 Diocese of Canarias
 Diocese of Córdoba

References

Spanish Roman Catholic bishops
Bishops appointed by Pope Paul VI
1920 births
2005 deaths